The western naked-backed fruit bat (Dobsonia peronii) is a species of megabat in the family Pteropodidae. It is endemic to Indonesia. Its natural habitat is subtropical or tropical dry forests.

References

External links

Dobsonia
Bats of Indonesia
Endemic fauna of Indonesia
Fauna of the Lesser Sunda Islands
Taxonomy articles created by Polbot
Mammals described in 1810
Taxa named by Étienne Geoffroy Saint-Hilaire